Susanne Rottenbacher (born 11 July 1969) is a German artist primarily concerned with light, color and installation.

Life and work

Susanne Rottenbacher studied stage design at Barnard College from 1988 to 1991 in New York (B.A.) and then (1991-1992) completed a degree in light (MSc) at the Bartlett School of Architecture and Planning in London. She worked as a set designer at the Deutsche Oper Berlin and as a light designer for the "LichtKunstLicht" planning office. In this context, among other things, she designed the lighting design for the Federal Chancellery and the new government buildings. She has been working as a freelance light artist since 2007. Susanne Rottenbacher creates expansive installations from sculptural elements that can best be described as light-colored bodies. Her sculptures are characterised by great lightness and transparency and change in dialogue with the surrounding space and times of day. They penetrate the surrounding space like three-dimensional drawings and thus reinterpret it. The organically curved forms seem to be in dynamic motion and at the same time frozen in time and space.

Awards

Exhibitions (selection)
 2007: LICHTBERLIN, Parcours Großer Tiergarten Berlin, Group exhibition
 2008: "Berlin im Licht", Märkisches Museum, Berlin, Group exhibition
 2010: Lichtparcours Braunschweig 2010, Group exhibition
 2011: "MAX", Max-Planck-Institut, Berlin, Solo exhibition
 2012: "Freiheit", Christuskirche Köln, Art Cologne, Solo exhibition
 2013: TINA B., The Prague Contemporary Art Festival, GASK gallery (Czech Museum of Fine Arts)
 2014: "Scheinwerfer, Lichtkunst in Deutschland im 21. Jahrhundert", Kunstmuseum Celle
 2014: Art Dubai, Salsali Private Museum, Dubai
 2015: The Looking Glass Room`s Exploding Inevitable - 11m2, Berlin, Solo exhibition
 2015: German Cool - SPM Salsali Private Museum, Dubai, Group exhibition
 2016: "Unpainted LAB 3.0. (Nate Hitchcock)", Kesselhalle München, Group exhibition
 2017: "Signal, Lichtkunst aus der Sammlung Robert Simon", Kunstmuseum Celle,
 2017: La Biennale di Venezia, Group exhibition "Body and Soul", Palazzo Pisani, UNPAINTED art fair
 2017: "Disassembly", BOX Freiraum, Berlin, Solo exhibition
 2018: Haus am Waldsee im Bikini Berlin, "The Twist 01", Solo exhibition
 2018: "Border Matters", Kunsthalle 1, Centre of Contemporary Art, Centro Cultural Andratx Mallorca, Group exhibition
 2018: "Commedia della Luce", Gallery SER, Centro Cultural Andratx Mallorca, Solo exhibition
 2019 "Museum of Now", Berlin Art Society, Berlin, Group exhibition
 2019 "Winterlicht", DA Kunsthaus Kloster Gravenhorst, Solo exhibition
 2020 "PArt-Producers Art Platform", Rene Spiegelberger Stiftung, Hamburg, Group exhibition (digital)
 2020 "In einem anderen Licht", Kunsthaus Dahlem Berlin, Solo exhibition
 2021 "Im Schein der Sterne", Museum Starnberger See, Group Exhibition

Further reading 
 Susanne Rottenbacher - Radiationen, STRZELECKIBOOKS Verlag, Cologne 2016, 
 Susanne Rottenbacher, Volume I – Beginning to see the light, www.darling publications.de, Cologne 2009, 
 Berlin im Licht, Exhibition catalogue, Stiftung Stadtmuseum Berlin, Märkisches Museum, Dr. Yvonne Ziegler, Berlin 2008, 
 LICHTBERLIN, Parcours Tiergarten, Exhibition catalogue, Christiane Meixner, published by: Bruno Dorn Verlag, Berlin 2007, 
 Lichtparcours Braunschweig 2010, Exhibition catalogue, Gesine Borcherdt, published by: Appelhans Verlag 2010

References

External links
 
 
 BOB, The international magazine of space design, Article about Susanne Rottenbacher

1969 births
Living people
German artists
Light artists
Barnard College alumni
Public art in Mumbai